Rhoicissus tridentata is a climbing plant in the family Vitaceae.

Parts of the plant are used in South Africa in traditional herbal remedies during pregnancy.

References

Vitaceae